Smith County is a county in the U.S. state of Tennessee. As of the 2020 census, the population was 19,904. Smith County is located in the region of the state known as Middle Tennessee. Its county seat is Carthage. The county was organized in 1799 and is named for Daniel Smith, a Revolutionary War veteran who made the first map of Tennessee and served as a United States senator.

Smith County is part of the Nashville-Davidson–Murfreesboro–Franklin, TN Metropolitan Statistical Area.

History

Smith County was established in 1799 from a portion of Sumner County, and was named for Daniel Smith, a U.S. Senator and former Secretary of the Southwest Territory.  The location of the county seat was hotly contested between Bledsoesborough (near modern Dixon Springs) and William Walton's ferry and tavern at the confluence of the Caney Fork and the Cumberland River. In 1804, voters chose Walton's site, and a town, named Carthage, was platted the following year.

Smith County was the site of a large saltpeter mine. Piper Cave, located near Monoville, contains the poorly preserved remnants of dozens of saltpeter leaching vats. Most saltpeter mining in Middle Tennessee took place during the War of 1812 and the Civil War, though the exact dates of this operation are unclear.

Geography

The county is located in a transition area between the rugged Highland Rim to the east and the flatter Nashville Basin to the west. The Caney Fork has its confluence with the Cumberland River in Carthage; these are the primary waterways flowing through the county. Cordell Hull Dam on the Cumberland is located near Carthage.

Adjacent counties
Macon County (north)
Jackson County (northeast)
Putnam County (east)
DeKalb County (southeast)
Wilson County (west)
Trousdale County (northwest)

State protected areas
Cordell Hull Wildlife Management Area (part)

Highways

Demographics

2020 census

As of the 2020 United States census, there were 19,904 people, 7,603 households, and 5,409 families residing in the county.

2000 census
As of the census of 2000, there were 17,712 people, 6,878 households, and 5,069 families residing in the county.  The population density was 56 people per square mile (22/km2).  There were 7,665 housing units at an average density of 24 per square mile (9/km2).  The racial makeup of the county was 95.42% White, 2.53% Black or African American, 0.37% Native American, 0.17% Asian, 0.01% Pacific Islander, 0.59% from other races, and 0.93% from two or more races.  1.13% of the population were Hispanic or Latino of any race.

There were 6,878 households, out of which 34.10% had children under the age of 18 living with them, 60.10% were married couples living together, 9.80% had a female householder with no husband present, and 26.30% were non-families. 23.40% of all households were made up of individuals, and 11.10% had someone living alone who was 65 years of age or older.  The average household size was 2.55 and the average family size was 3.00.

In the county, the population was spread out, with 25.50% under the age of 18, 8.00% from 18 to 24, 30.00% from 25 to 44, 23.10% from 45 to 64, and 13.40% who were 65 years of age or older.  The median age was 37 years. For every 100 females, there were 97.00 males.  For every 100 females age 18 and over, there were 92.40 males.

The median income for a household in the county was $35,625, and the median income for a family was $41,645. Males had a median income of $30,853 versus $22,133 for females. The per capita income for the county was $17,473.  About 10.30% of families and 12.20% of the population were below the poverty line, including 14.70% of those under age 18 and 14.80% of those age 65 or over.

Communities

Towns
Carthage (county seat)
Gordonsville
South Carthage

Unincorporated communities

Brush Creek
Chestnut Mound
Defeated
Difficult
Dixon Springs
Elmwood
Enigma
Hickman
Kempville
Lancaster
New Middleton
Pleasant Shade
Riddleton
Rome
Stonewall

Education
The Smith County School System operates nine schools:

 Carthage Elementary School, Carthage (PreK–4)
 Defeated Elementary School, Defeated (PreK–8)
 Forks River Elementary School, Elmwood (PreK–8)
 Gordonsville Elementary School, Gordonsville (3–6)
 Gordonsville High School, Gordonsville (7–12)
 New Middleton Elementary School, New Middleton (PreK–2)
 Union Heights Elementary School, Rome (PreK–8)
 Smith County Middle School, South Carthage (5–8)
 Smith County High School, Carthage (9–12)

The county formerly operated Pleasant Shade Elementary School, which closed in 2007, and Cox Davidson Elementary, which closed sometime in the 1950s. New Middleton Elementary was formerly PreK–8, while Gordonsville Elementary was formerly PreK–6. A realignment beginning with the 2017–2018 school year resulted in the current grade alignment of those schools.

Politics
Prior to 2008, Smith County was a Democratic Party stronghold at the presidential level. The county failed to back a Democratic candidate only twice between the Civil War and 2004, when voting for George Wallace in 1968 and against George McGovern in 1972. However, while the county was Carthage resident Al Gore's fourth strongest statewide in his 2000 presidential bid, he failed to win an increasingly Republican Tennessee. Since then, Smith County has swung hard towards the Republican Party similar to the rest of the state outside of Memphis and Nashville. Hillary Clinton failed to win even a quarter of the county's votes in 2016, a far cry from the 71 percent and 62 percent her husband Bill won in the county with Gore also on the ticket.

See also
National Register of Historic Places listings in Smith County, Tennessee

References

External links

Smith County  at TN.gov
Smith County Chamber of Commerce
UT Extension office
TNGenWeb
Tennessee Central Economic Alliance for Smith County

 
Nashville metropolitan area
Counties of Appalachia
1799 establishments in Tennessee
Populated places established in 1799
Middle Tennessee